Andorra competed at the 2016 Summer Olympics in Rio de Janeiro, Brazil, from 5 to 21 August 2016. This was the nation's eleventh consecutive appearance at the Summer Olympics.

The Andorra Olympic Committee sent a total of five athletes, two men and three women, to the Games, competing in athletics, judo, shooting, and swimming. Four of them made their maiden appearance at these Games, with swimmer Mónica Ramírez being the only returning athlete from London 2012. Half-middleweight judoka Laura Sallés was the nation's flag bearer in the opening ceremony. Andorra, however, has yet to win its first ever Olympic medal.

Athletics
 
Andorra received a universality slot from IAAF to send a male athlete to the Olympics.

Track & road events

Judo
 
Andorra received an invitation from the Tripartite Commission to send a judoka competing in the women's half-middleweight category (63 kg) to the Olympics.

Shooting
 
Andorra received an invitation from the Tripartite Commission to send a women's air rifle shooter to the Olympics.

Qualification Legend: Q = Qualify for the next round; q = Qualify for the bronze medal (shotgun)

Swimming

Andorra received a Universality invitation from FINA to send two swimmers (one male and one female) to the Olympics.

References

External links 
 

Olympics
2016
Nations at the 2016 Summer Olympics